Carlos Henderson (born December 19, 1994) is an American football wide receiver. He played college football at Louisiana Tech, and was drafted by the Denver Broncos in the third round of the 2017 NFL Draft.

Early years
Henderson attended McDonogh 35 High School in New Orleans, Louisiana. He committed to Louisiana Tech University to play college football.

College career
Henderson played at Louisiana Tech from 2013 to 2016. As a junior, he was named the Conference USA Offensive Player of the Year and Special Teams Player of the Year. He had 82 receptions for 1,535 yards and 19 touchdowns on offense and 805 kick return yards and two touchdowns. During his career, he had 147 receptions for 2,878 yards and 28 touchdowns. He was named honorable mention All-Conference USA kick returner for the 2014 and 2015 seasons.

On December 26, 2016, Henderson announced on his Instagram that he would forgo his senior season and enter the 2017 NFL Draft.

Professional career
Henderson was one of 59 collegiate wide receivers to attend the NFL Scouting Combine in Indianapolis, Indiana. He performed all of the combine drills and finished 15th among his position group in the 40-yard dash. He also finished seventh in the broad jump and tied for ninth among wide receivers in the vertical jump. On March 21, 2017, he attended Louisiana's Tech pro Day, along with Trent Taylor, Xavier Woods, Chad Williams, and 13 other prospects. Henderson opted to only run positional drills and had only one drop as scouts and team representatives from all 32 NFL teams attended. At the conclusion of the pre-draft process, Henderson was projected to be a third or fourth round pick by NFL draft experts and scouts. He was ranked the 13th best wide receiver in the draft by NFLDraftScout.com.

Denver Broncos
The Denver Broncos selected Henderson in the third round (82nd overall) of the 2017 NFL Draft. He was the tenth wide receiver selected in 2017 and was the first of three Louisiana Tech players selected, along with wide receiver Trent Taylor and safety Xavier Woods. On May 26, 2017, the Broncos signed Henderson to a four-year, $3.32 million contract that includes a signing bonus of $817,984.

2017 season
On August 13, 2017, Henderson underwent surgery to repair a torn ligament in his left thumb. On September 2, 2017, the Broncos placed Henderson on injured reserve due to his thumb injury.

2018 season
Henderson opened up training camp on the "did not report" list as he was dealing with a "personal matter". On August 15, 2018, Henderson was suspended one game for violating the NFL's substance abuse policy. He was waived on September 1, 2018 and was signed to the practice squad the next day. He was released on September 13, 2018.

Washington Redskins
Henderson signed with the practice squad of the Washington Redskins on December 26, 2018. He signed a reserve/future contract with the Redskins on December 31, 2018. The Redskins waived him on January 7, 2019.

Saskatchewan Roughriders
Henderson signed a contract extension through the 2022 season with the Saskatchewan Roughriders on January 6, 2021. He was released on July 30, 2021.

Birmingham Stallions
Henderson signed with the Birmingham Stallions of the United States Football League on May 27, 2022. He was subsequently transferred to the team's inactive roster and the team released him on June 1.

References

External links
Louisiana Tech Bulldogs bio

1994 births
Living people
Players of American football from New Orleans
Players of Canadian football from New Orleans
American football wide receivers
American football return specialists
Louisiana Tech Bulldogs football players
Denver Broncos players
Washington Redskins players
Saskatchewan Roughriders players
Canadian football wide receivers
American players of Canadian football
Birmingham Stallions (2022) players